Schaumburg-Lippe, also Lippe-Schaumburg, was created as a county in 1647, became a principality in 1807, a free state in 1918, and was until 1946 a small state in Germany, located in the present day state of Lower Saxony, with its capital at Bückeburg and an area of 340 km² (131 sq. mi.) and over 40,000 inhabitants.

History 

Schaumburg-Lippe was formed as a county in 1647 through the division of the County of Schaumburg by treaties between the Duke of Brunswick-Lüneburg, the Landgrave of Hesse-Kassel and the Count of Lippe. The division occurred because Count Otto V of Holstein-Schaumburg had died in 1640 leaving no male heir. Initially Schaumburg-Lippe's position was somewhat precarious: it had to share a wide variety of institutions and facilities with the County of Schaumburg (which belonged to Hesse-Kassel), including the representative assembly and the highly productive Bückeberg mines, and the Landgrave of Hesse-Kassel retained some feudal rights over it. It was further threatened by the headstrong policies of ruling Count Friedrich Christian. To counter these threats, Friedrich's grandson Count Wilhelm (who reigned 1748–1777) retained a standing army of up to 1000 troops – quite a lot for such a small territory.

With Wilhelm's death in 1777, the junior Schaumburg-Lippe-Alverdissen inherited the County, thereby reuniting Schaumburg-Lippe with Lippe-Alverdissen.

Schaumburg-Lippe was a county until 1807 when it became a principality; from 1871 it was a state within the German Empire. In 1913, it was the smallest state in the German Empire in terms of population. The capital was Bückeburg, and Stadthagen was the only other town. Under the constitution of 1868, there was a legislative diet of 15 members, 10 elected by the towns and rural districts and 1 each by the nobility, clergy and educated classes, the remaining 2 nominated by the prince. Schaumburg-Lippe sent one member to the Bundesrat (federal council) and one deputy to the Reichstag. It lasted until the end of the German monarchies in 1918, when it became a free state as the Free State of Schaumburg-Lippe. In November 1918, Prince Adolf was the second last reigning German monarch to abdicate.

His brother, Wolrad, Prince of Schaumburg-Lippe, became the Head of the Princely House in 1936 and he is the grandfather of the current Head, Alexander, Prince of Schaumburg-Lippe (b.1958).

Rulers of Schaumburg-Lippe

See also

List of consorts of Lippe

References 

 
States and territories disestablished in 1918
States and territories established in 1643
States of the Confederation of the Rhine
States of the German Confederation
States of the North German Confederation
States of the German Empire
Former states and territories of Lower Saxony
1643 establishments in the Holy Roman Empire
Principalities of the Holy Roman Empire